Justitieråd (Swedish title).

 Justice of the Supreme Court of Sweden 
 Justice of the Supreme Court of Finland